Bohlen is a surname shared by several notable people, among them being:

Bohlen
 Avis Bohlen (born 1940), American diplomat
 Charles E. Bohlen (1904–1974), American diplomat
 Dieter Bohlen (born 1954), German musician
 Francis Bohlen (1868–1942), American Algernon Sydney Biddle professor of law at the University of Pennsylvania Law School
 Henry Bohlen (1810–1862), German-American who became a Union general during the American Civil War  
 Jim Bohlen (1926–2010), American-born Canadian political activist

von Bohlen
 Davey von Bohlen (born 1975), American musician

van Bohlen
 Peter van Bohlen (1796–1840), German academic

von Bohlen und Halbach
 Gustav Krupp von Bohlen und Halbach (1870–1950), German industrialist
 Alfried Krupp von Bohlen und Halbach (1907–1967), German industrialist
 Arndt von Bohlen und Halbach (1938–1986), German entrepreneur

See also
 Information about von and van in human names: Von, Van (Dutch), Tussenvoegsel

Notes 

German-language surnames